The canton of Le Pont-de-Claix is an administrative division of the Isère department, eastern France. It was created at the French canton reorganisation which came into effect in March 2015. Its seat is in Le Pont-de-Claix.

It consists of the following communes:
 
Brié-et-Angonnes
Champagnier
Champ-sur-Drac
Le Gua
Herbeys
Jarrie
Notre-Dame-de-Commiers
Le Pont-de-Claix
Saint-Georges-de-Commiers
Saint-Paul-de-Varces
Varces-Allières-et-Risset
Vif

References

Cantons of Isère